(pl.  ) is an Arabic term meaning "sitting room", used to describe various types of special gatherings among common interest groups of administrative, social or religious nature in countries with linguistic or cultural connections to Islamic countries. The Majlis can refer to a legislature as well and is used in the name of legislative councils or assemblies in some of the states where Islamic culture dominates.

Etymology
Majlis is the Arabic word for a sitting room. Its Semitic root is the Arabic verb  jalas meaning 'to sit',  (cf. British English 'sitting room' and 'seat').

It is also romanized as Mejlis or Majles.

History
In pre-Islamic Arabia, Majlis was a tribal council in which the male members participated in making decisions of common interest. The council was presided over by the chief (Sheikh) During the period of the Rashidun Caliphate majlis ash-shura was formed. The majlis during the Rashidun was to elect a new caliph. Al-Mawardi has written that members of the majlis should satisfy three conditions: they must be just, they must have enough knowledge to distinguish a good caliph from a bad one, and must have sufficient wisdom and judgment to select the best caliph.

Residential

The term majlis is also used to refer to a private place where guests, usually male, are received and entertained. Frequently, the room has cushions placed around the walls where the visitors sit, either with the cushions placed directly on the floor or upon a raised shelf.

In many Arab homes, the majlis is the meeting room or front parlor used to entertain visitors. In Saudi Arabia, the decoration of the majlis in the home is often the responsibility of the women of the house, who either decorate the area themselves or barter with other women to do it for them. In the Asir Province and in neighboring parts of Yemen, geometric designs and bright colors are used in "majlis painting", or nagash painting. The term majlis is used to refer to a private place where house guests and friends are received and entertained. Because hospitality is taken seriously, many families take pride in making their guests comfortable when visiting.

Sometimes public waiting rooms are also called a majlis, since this is an area where people meet and visit. Here the traditional "majlis painting or nagash painting has been added to the interior design of the room. The provincial airport in Abha has recently been designed to reflect the cultural heritage of the region, an airport official said: “Abha is the first city in the Kingdom of Saudi Arabia to have its airport decorated in a local-heritage style,” said Provincial Airport Director Abdul Aziz Abu Harba. “The seating arrangement at the airport lounge has been in the form of a traditional majlis and the walls are painted in various colors reflecting the natural beauty of Asir.”

In the Najd province of Saudi Arabia, wall coverings include stars shapes and other geometric designs carved into the wall covering itself. Courtyards and upper pillared porticoes are principal features of the best Nadjdi architecture, in addition to the fine incised plaster wood (jiss) and painted window shutters, which decorate the reception rooms. Good examples of plasterwork can often be seen in the gaping ruins of torn-down buildings- the effect is light, delicate and airy. It is usually around the majlis, around the coffee hearth and along the walls above where guests sat on rugs, against cushions. Doughty wondered if this "parquetting of jis", this "gypsum fretwork... all adorning and unenclosed" originated from India. However, the Najd fretwork seems very different from that seen in the Eastern Province and Oman, which are linked to Indian traditions, and rather resembles the motifs and patterns found in ancient Mesopotamia. The rosette, the star, the triangle and the stepped pinnacle pattern of dadoes are all ancient patterns, and can be found all over the Middle East of antiquity. Qassim seems to be the home of this art, and there it is normally worked in hard white plaster (though what you see is usually begrimed by the smoke of the coffee hearth). In Riyadh, examples can be seen in unadorned clay."

Legislatures 
 Azerbaijan — the National Assembly is known as Milli Məclis
 Circassian Majlis — The unity between the coastal Adyghe tribes in Circassia
 Crimea (Ukraine-aligned) — Mejlis of the Crimean Tatar People
 Cyprus — Temsilciler Meclisi, Republic of Cyprus' House of Representatives
 Northern Cyprus — Cumhuriyet Meclisi, Northern Cyprus' Assembly of the Republic
 Indonesia — The People's Consultative Assembly of Indonesia is, in Indonesian language, Majelis Permusyawaratan Rakyat (MPR)
 Iran —  The Islamic Consultative Assembly is known as Majles-e Showrā-ye Eslāmī
 Jordan — The Parliament of Jordan is known in Arabic as Majlis Al-Umma, and its lower House of Representatives is also known as Majlis Al-Nuwaab
 Kazakhstan — Majilis
 Kuwait — The National Assembly of Kuwait is known in Arabic as Majlis-al-Umma
 Malaysia - There are lots of meaning of Majlis in Malaysia because Malaysia is a dominant Muslim multiracial country. Malaysians often refer the word Majlis in the national Malay language to the local authorities such as the town council (Majlis Perbandaran) or the city council (Majlis Bandar Raya). The word Majlis can also refer to government agencies such as the People's Trust Council (Majlis Amanah Rakyat) among the indigenous and Bumiputra Malays, the National Security Council (Majlis Keselamatan Negara),   the Malaysian Examination Council (Majlis Peperiksaan Malaysia) among local students and foreigners, and for the Muslims in the country the word Majlis often relates to Islamic affairs and customs of the Malays (Majlis Hal Ehwal Agama Islam dan Adat Istiadat) and among the nine Kings of Malaysia (Majlis Raja-Raja). 
 Maldives — Majlis of the Maldives
 Oman — Majlis of Oman
 Pakistan — The Parliament of Pakistan is officially known as the Majlis-e-Shoora
 Saudi Arabia — Majlis of Saudi Arabia
 Tajikistan - the bicameral Supreme Assembly is known as the Majlisi Oli, the upper house National Assembly being known as the Majlis-i Milli, while the Assembly of Representatives, the lower house, is known as the Majlis-is Namoyandagon    
 Turkey — the Grand National Assembly is known as Türkiye Büyük Millet Meclisi
 Turkmenistan —  the Assembly of Turkmenistan is known as the Türkmenistanyň mejlisi
 Uzbekistan — The Oliy Majlis
 UAE — Federal Supreme Council and Federal National Council, both called "majlis" in Arabic

Other uses 
 Majlis is also the name of an organization in Mumbai, India which works for women's rights.
 Majlis is also used to mean a salon (musical or scientific), especially during the Abbasid era, e.g., for discussing the recent translations from Greek. This sense is sometimes now distinguished as an "adabi majlis" ("artistic majlis"). See Dewaniya
 The Majlis is the title of a Muslim periodical published in South Africa.
 MAJLIS is used as the name of the annual conference held by the Middle East Oracle User Group (MEOUG)
All India Majlis-e-Ittehadul Muslimeen is a political party in India that works for the upliftment of Muslims and other minority communities in India.
 Majlis 'Umumi is the name of general council of Sanjak of Jerusalem in Ottoman Empire, established in Jerusalem in 1913 by representative of different qadaas with main meetings once a year to decide on a budget for the sanjak.
 Majlis Idara is the name of administrative council of sanjak, responsible for its general administration as part of Ottoman empire.
Usage in the Malay language in Malaysia
 The word majlis used by Malaysians often combines with daily conversations such as when there is a need of meeting (majlis mesyuarat), communal work (majlis gotong-royong), open houses during festive seasons (majlis rumah terbuka), gatherings (majlis kenduri doa selamat) and a knowledge session sharing such as open mic done in a public space or mosques for the muslims (majlis ilmu)

Inscription on UNESCO 
On December 4, 2015, the majlis was inscribed on UNESCO’s List of Intangible Cultural Heritage in a joint file involving the participation of the Kingdom of Saudi Arabia, United Arab Emirates, Sultanate of Oman, and Qatar. The inscription is a testament to the value of the majlis as a social and cultural function, as well as a living tradition, and secures its preservation and continuity as the seat of family, social and political gatherings throughout history.

See also 

 Assembly (disambiguation)
 Board of directors
 Council (disambiguation)
 Diet (assembly)
 Parliament
 Senate

References

External links 

 Shia Muslim Majlis
 Majlislaw.com
 Arabic Majlis
 Yahusain.com: Majlis 

Arabic words and phrases
Arab culture
Legislative buildings
Rooms
Parliaments by country